Henry Nevill may refer to:
Henry Nevill, 2nd Earl of Abergavenny (1755–1843), British nobleman
Henry Nevill, 3rd Marquess of Abergavenny (1854–1938), British nobleman
Henry Nevill, 6th Baron Bergavenny (died 1587), English nobleman
Henry Nevill, 9th Baron Bergavenny (1580-1641), English nobleman
Henry Nevill (priest) (1821–1900), Archdeacon of Norfolk

See also
Henry Neville (disambiguation)